The 31st Academy Awards ceremony was held on April 6, 1959, to honor the best films of 1958. The night was dominated by Gigi, which won nine Oscars, breaking the previous record of eight set by Gone with the Wind and tied by From Here to Eternity and On the Waterfront.

Gigi set a new record for biggest Oscars sweep, winning all nine of its nominations, which would later be tied by The Last Emperor in 1987 and broken, in 2003, when The Lord of the Rings: The Return of the King won all 11 of its nominations. Finally, Gigi was the last film until The Last Emperor to win Best Picture without any acting nominations.

The ceremony was hosted by an ensemble of actors: Jerry Lewis, Mort Sahl, Tony Randall, Bob Hope, David Niven, and Laurence Olivier. Niven won Best Actor that night, making him the only host in Oscar history to have win an award while hosting. The show's producer, Jerry Wald, started cutting numbers from the show to make sure it ran on time, but cut too much material, and the ceremony ended 20 minutes early, leaving Jerry Lewis to attempt to fill in the time. Eventually, NBC cut to a re-run of a sports show.



Awards

Nominations announced on February 23, 1959. Winners are listed first and highlighted with boldface.

Academy Honorary Award
Maurice Chevalier “for his contributions to the world of entertainment for more than half a century.”

Irving G. Thalberg Memorial Award
Jack L. Warner

Presenters and performers

Presenters
Buddy Adler (Presenter: Irving G. Thalberg Memorial Award)
Eddie Albert and Vincent Price (Presenters: Art Direction Award)
June Allyson and Dick Powell (Presenters: Musical Scoring Awards)
Ingrid Bergman and Cary Grant (Presenters: Best Motion Picture)
Dirk Bogarde, Van Heflin, and Elizabeth Taylor (Presenters: Writing Awards)
Red Buttons and Shelley Winters (Presenters: Best Supporting Actress)
James Cagney and Kim Novak (Presenters: Best Actress)
Cyd Charisse and Robert Stack (Presenters: Best Foreign Language Film)
Gary Cooper and Millie Perkins (Presenters: Best Director)
Wendell Corey and Ernie Kovacs (Presenters: Costume Design Award)
Tony Curtis and Janet Leigh (Presenters: Short Subjects Awards)
Bette Davis and Anthony Quinn (Presenters: Best Supporting Actor)
Doris Day and Rock Hudson (Presenters: Cinematography Awards)
Irene Dunne and John Wayne (Presenters: Best Actor)
Steve Forrest and Jean Simmons (Presenters: Best Film Editing)
Anthony Franciosa and Eva Marie Saint (Presenters: Music Awards)
Charlton Heston and Jane Wyman (Presenters: Best Sound Recording)
Sophia Loren and Dean Martin (Presenters: Best Original Song)
Shirley MacLaine and Peter Ustinov (Presenters: Best Visual Effects)
Rosalind Russell (Presenter: Honorary Award to Maurice Chevalier)
Robert Wagner and Natalie Wood (Presenters: Documentary Awards)

Performers
Nick Adams, Anna Maria Alberghetti, James Darren, Dean Jones, Connie Stevens, and Tuesday Weld ("Almost In Your Arms" from Houseboat)
Joan Collins, Angela Lansbury and Dana Wynter ("It's Great Not to Be Nominated")
Kirk Douglas and Burt Lancaster ("It's Alright With Us")
Eddie Fisher ("To Love and Be Loved" from Some Came Running)
Rhonda Fleming and Howard Keel ("A Very Precious Love" from Marjorie Morningstar)
Tony Martin ("Gigi" from Gigi)
John Raitt ("A Certain Smile" from A Certain Smile)

Multiple nominations and awards

These films had multiple nominations:

9 nominations: The Defiant Ones, Gigi
7 nominations: Separate Tables
6 nominations: Auntie Mame, Cat on a Hot Tin Roof, and I Want to Live!
5 nominations: Some Came Running
3 nominations: A Certain Smile, The Old Man and the Sea, South Pacific, and The Young Lions
2 nominations: Bell, Book and Candle; The Big Country; Houseboat; Journey into Spring; Teacher's Pet; Vertigo; and White Wilderness

The following films received multiple awards.

9 wins: Gigi
2 wins: The Defiant Ones and Separate Tables

See also
1958 in film
 1st Grammy Awards
 10th Primetime Emmy Awards
 11th Primetime Emmy Awards
 12th British Academy Film Awards
 13th Tony Awards
 16th Golden Globe Awards

References

Academy Awards ceremonies
1958 film awards
1958 awards in the United States
1959 in Los Angeles
1959 in American cinema
April 1959 events in the United States